Nathan Salsi (born June 12, 1981 in Pittsburgh, Pennsylvania) is an American soccer player who last played for the Pittsburgh Riverhounds in the USL Second Division.

On January 22, 2010 he was ranked 11th in the USL Second Division Top 15 of the Decade, which announced a list of the best and most influential players of the previous decade.

Career

Amateur
Salsi grew up in North Huntingdon, Pennsylvania, attended Norwin High School, and played college soccer at the Duquesne University, where he was named to the Atlantic 10 First Team All Conference.

Professional
Salsi turned professional in 2004 when he signed to play for the Pittsburgh Riverhounds in the USL Second Division, and remained with the team through the end of 2006.

Salsi returned to the Riverhounds in 2008 following their hiatus year in 2007, and has been ever-present in the Pittsburgh back line, playing in over 40 games for the team, and acting as club captain. He was named to the All-USL Division 2 team in both 2004 and 2005.

Salsi continues to be active with the club now as a head coach in the Riverhounds Development Academy

References

External links
Riverhounds bio
Duquesne bio

1981 births
Living people
American soccer players
Duquesne Dukes men's soccer players
Pittsburgh Riverhounds SC players
Soccer players from Pennsylvania
Association football defenders